Ignite the Night is the third studio album by American country music artist Chase Rice, and his third overall.  It was released on August 19, 2014 via Dack Janiels and Columbia Nashville.

Commercial performance
The album debuted at number one on the Billboard Top Country Albums and at number three on the Billboard 200, selling 44,000 copies. As of November 2015, the album has sold 305,300 copies in the U.S.

In Canada, the album debuted at number seven on the Canadian Albums Chart, selling 2,600 copies in its first week.

Track listing

Personnel
Nick Buda – drums
Scott Cooke – bass guitar, drum loop, electric guitar, programming, synthesizer
Dallas Davidson – background vocals
Chris DeStefano – bass guitar, drum programming, acoustic guitar, electric guitar, mandolin, pedal steel guitar, percussion, background vocals
Shannon Forrest – drums
Nicolle Galyon – drum programming 
Ashley Gorley – background vocals
Wes Hightower – background vocals
Charlie Judge – Hammond B-3 organ, strings, synthesizer 
Rob McNelley – electric guitar
Russ Pahl – pedal steel guitar
Chase Rice – lead vocals
Darren Savard – acoustic guitar, electric guitar, mandolin 
Adam Shoenfeld – electric guitar, solo
Dallas Smith – background vocals
Ilya Toshinsky – banjo, 12-string guitar, acoustic guitar, baritone guitar, electric guitar, slide guitar

Chart performance

Weekly charts

Year-end charts

References

2014 debut albums
Chase Rice albums
Columbia Records albums